The 20th Los Angeles Film Critics Association Awards, honoring the best in film for 1994, were given on 10 December 1994.

Winners
Best Picture:
Pulp Fiction
 Runner-up: The Shawshank Redemption
Best Director:
Quentin Tarantino – Pulp Fiction
 Runner-up: Robert Redford - Quiz Show
Best Actor:
John Travolta – Pulp Fiction
 Runner-up: Morgan Freeman - The Shawshank Redemption
Best Actress:
Jessica Lange – Blue Sky
 Runner-up: Jodie Foster - Nell
Best Supporting Actor:
Martin Landau – Ed Wood
 Runner-up: Samuel L Jackson - Pulp Fiction
Best Supporting Actress:
Dianne Wiest – Bullets over Broadway
 Runner-up: Uma Thurman - Pulp Fiction
Best Screenplay:
Quentin Tarantino and Roger Avary – Pulp Fiction
 Runner-up: Frank Darabont - The Shawshank Redemption
Best Cinematography:
Stefan Czapsky – Ed Wood
 Runner-up: John Toll - Legends of the Fall
Best Production Design:
Dennis Gassner - The Hudsucker Proxy
Best Music Score:
Howard Shore – Ed Wood
Best Foreign-Language Film:
Red (Trois couleurs: Rouge) • Poland/France/Switzerland
 Runner-up: Burnt by the Sun • Russia
Best Non-Fiction Film:
Hoop Dreams
Best Animation:
The Lion King
The Douglas Edwards Experimental/Independent Film/Video Award:
John Maybury – Remembrance of Things Fast: True Stories Visual Lies 
New Generation Award:
John Dahl – Red Rock West and The Last Seduction
Career Achievement Award:
Billy Wilder
Special Citation:
Pauline Kael

References

External links
20th Annual Los Angeles Film Critics Association Awards

1994
Los Angeles Film Critics Association Awards
Los Angeles Film Critics Association Awards
Los Angeles Film Critics Association Awards
Los Angeles Film Critics Association Awards